Super Chicken is a segment that ran on the animated television series George of the Jungle. It was produced by Jay Ward and Bill Scott, who earlier had created the Rocky and Bullwinkle cartoons. It debuted September 9, 1967, on ABC.

Series overview
Super Chicken (voiced by Bill Scott in a Boston Brahmin accent) is an anthropomorphic chicken and superhero who is the alter-ego of wealthy Henry Cabot Henhouse III (whose name was a play on Henry Cabot Lodge, Jr.). He has a lion sidekick named Fred (a vegetarian) (voiced by Paul Frees impersonating Ed Wynn) who wears an inside-out sweatshirt with a backwards F on it and acts as Henry's servant when in his civilian lifestyle. When danger rears its ugly head, Henhouse takes his "Super Sauce" (often from a martini glass), prepared by Fred, and dons his "Super Suit," which consists of a plumed cavalier's hat, cape, Wellington boots, mask and sword. In a running gag, Henhouse typically makes some comment on the taste of the Super Sauce (e.g., "No bay leaf?") but is cut off in mid-sentence as the "Super Sauce" begins to take effect, subjecting Henhouse to wild gyrations before he emerges, changed into Super Chicken.  

Super Chicken usually begins their adventures with the battle cry, "To the Super Coop, Fred!" The Super Coop is an egg-shaped air vehicle flown by Super Chicken and Fred to the rescue of innocent victims of crime. When Fred comments on his latest injury, Super Chicken responds with a variation of the theme, "You knew the job was dangerous when you took it, Fred!" Following his own mistakes, Super Chicken remarks, "I'm glad no one was here to see that!"   Once Super-Chicken and Fred finally arrest the criminal, the episode always ends with a narrator voicing: "So, when you hear that cry in the sky...", (followed by Super Chicken "clucking" the Charge (bugle call) "you'll know it's SUPER CHICKEN!" (frequently humorously adapted to the circumstances of the episode).

Super Chicken was a parody of the well-off WASP of the 1950s, horn-rimmed glasses wearing, martini drinking, numeraled surname bearing, and having a sense of social obligation (fulfilled in this case by suiting up and fighting bizarre menaces to society). A similar, contemporary fictional character was Bruce Wayne, a millionaire who fought crime as Batman. Earlier uses of the theme included Zorro and the Scarlet Pimpernel.

The first pilot featured an all-star comedy cast, including Bill Dana with Don Knotts as the voice of Super Chicken. The project was shelved and eventually recast.

Episodes

Appearances in other media
In 1969, Gold Key Comics published two issues of a George of the Jungle comic book.  Each issue contained a story featuring Super Chicken. Issue #1 presented "The Stolen State", and #2 "The Astounding Dr. Gizmo!", both adaptations of cartoon episodes.

See also
 Chickenman (radio series)

References

Fictional chickens
George of the Jungle
Television series about chickens
American Broadcasting Company original programming
American superhero comedy television series
American children's animated comedy television series
American children's animated superhero television series
1960s American animated television series
1967 American television series debuts
1967 American television series endings
Parody superheroes
Fictional characters from Pittsburgh